EDF may refer to:

Organisations
 Eclaireurs de France, a French Scouting association
 Électricité de France, a French energy company
 EDF Energy, their British subsidiary
 EDF Luminus, their Belgian subsidiary
 Environmental Defense Fund, a US–based nonprofit environmental advocacy group

Military
 Estonian Defence Forces
 Eritrean Defence Forces
 Ethiopian National Defense Force (usually ENDF)
 European Defence Fund
 Joint Base Elmendorf–Richardson, in Anchorage, Alaska

Science and technology
 Earliest deadline first scheduling
 Empirical distribution function
 European Data Format, a medical data format
 Expected default frequency
 Electric ducted fan, an aircraft propulsion device

Other uses
 Earth Defense Force (disambiguation)
 European Development Fund, an instrument for European Union aid for development cooperation outside the EU